James Lockhart West was a Scottish amateur footballer who played as a right back in the Scottish League for Queen's Park. He later became a member of the club's committee.

Personal life 
West served in the Highland Light Infantry during the First World War and rose from private to second lieutenant during the course of the war.

Career statistics

Honours 
Queen's Park Strollers

 Scottish Amateur League (1): 1911–12
 Scottish Amateur Cup (2): 1911–12, 1919–20

References

1891 births
Scottish footballers
Scottish Football League players
British Army personnel of World War I
Association football fullbacks
Queen's Park F.C. players
Date of death missing
Highland Light Infantry officers
Place of death missing
Footballers from Glasgow
Queen's Park F.C. non-playing staff